J. Sam Ellis (born April 30, 1955) is a Republican former member of the North Carolina General Assembly who represented the state's thirty-ninth House district, including constituents in Wake County.  An electrical contractor from Raleigh, Ellis was defeated by Democrat Linda Coleman in the 2004 general election.

In 2002, incoming freshmen at the University of North Carolina were required to read "Approaching the Qur’an: The Early Revelations" by Michael Sells, a scholar of comparative religions at Haverford College. When they arrived on campus, they were to briefly discuss the book in small groups led by a member of the faculty. Ellis backed a campaign to remove the use of state funds from the book, stating "I don't want the students in the university system required to study this evil."

References

External links

|- 

Republican Party members of the North Carolina House of Representatives
Living people
21st-century American politicians
1955 births